Edwin Sykes was Dean of Ross from 1936 to 1948.

Webster was educated at Trinity College, Dublin; and ordained in 1900. After  a curacy in Castlemagner, he held he held incumbencies at  Ardnageehy, Cork, Shandon and Abbeystrewry.

References

Alumni of Trinity College Dublin
Deans of Ross, Ireland
20th-century Irish Anglican priests